The Keokuk Westerns played their first and only season of professional baseball in 1875 as a  member of the National Association of Professional Base Ball Players. They finished thirteenth in the league with a record of 1-12.

Regular season

Season standings

Record vs. opponents

Roster

Player stats

Batting
Note: G = Games played; AB = At bats; H = Hits; Avg. = Batting average; HR = Home runs; RBI = Runs batted in

Starting pitchers 
Note: G = Games pitched; IP = Innings pitched; W = Wins; L = Losses; ERA = Earned run average; SO = Strikeouts

References
1875 Keokuk Westerns season at Baseball Reference

Keokuk Westerns Season, 1875